WGLI (1290 AM) was a radio station licensed to Babylon, New York.

History 
Founded in 1958 by William Reuman the founder and owner of WWRL in New York City, the station went on the air on September 1, 1958, along with WGLI-FM. This made WGLI the first Long Island station to sign on both an AM & FM station on the same day.

In March 1960, Friendly Frost Inc. (a Long Island-based appliance store chain) acquired WGLI Inc. from Mr. Reuman and his partners.

Originally broadcasting with 1,000 watts, the station increased power to 5,000 watts in 1966 after being sold to new owner Martin F. Beck. Beck, along with his brother-in-law George H. Ross created Beck-Ross Communications in order to purchase WGLI, the company eventually grew to own 10 stations, including WBLI in Patchogue, New York. Beck-Ross sold the station to Greater Long Island Communications in October 1978. 
  
In 1988, it was purchased by WADO. The oldies format, which had been in place for some time, ended in August 1989. At first, WADO simulcast its signal on WGLI, but due to technical difficulties WGLI could no longer broadcast at its full power of 5,000 watts. As a result, WGLI was shut down so that WADO could expand their signal on AM 1280.

In 1990, the vacant radio facility was vandalized and a fire destroyed what was left of the building. Two of the three towers were still visible from Sunrise Highway in North Babylon for many years. An application was filed in 1996 to assign the call letters WZZU to the 1290 frequency, but was never granted. The license was cancelled in 1997.

Alumni 
 Al Case — one of the creators of Amityville Community Radio and on-air personality at WLNG
 Robert Siegel — former host of All Things Considered on National Public Radio, his first job in broadcasting was on WGLI where he used the pseudonym "Bob Charles"

See also 
 WKTU — formerly WGLI-FM, simulcast the AM on 103.5 FM
 WWSK — formerly WGLI-FM, simulcast the AM on 94.3 FM

References

External links 
 
 "The Mighty" 1290 WGLI — online radio station named after WGLI
 1290 WGLI Babylon Page
 Glen Burnie & Richard Hamilton, 1290 WGLI Babylon NY | July, 1982 – Airchexx.com
 

GLI
Defunct radio stations in the United States
Mass media in Suffolk County, New York
Babylon (town), New York
Radio stations disestablished in 1989
Radio stations established in 1958
1958 establishments in New York (state)
1989 disestablishments in New York (state)
GLI